Komovica is an alcoholic beverage popular in Serbia and North Macedonia. Komovica is a homemade rakia made of grape pomace, usually containing more than 50% alcohol by volume. It is mostly used for medical purposes.

See also 

 Pomace brandy

References

Further reading 
 The Agriculture of the Socialist Republic of Serbia, Vasa Rokić, Mirjana Stevčić - 1971

Pomace brandies
Serbian distilled drinks